Cookshire-Eaton is a city in the Estrie region of Quebec. It is the seat of Le Haut-Saint-François Regional County Municipality. Sherbrooke Airport is located there.

As part of the 2000–2006 municipal reorganization in Quebec, on July 24, 2002 the city of Cookshire, the municipality of Newport and the township of Eaton were merged to form Cookshire-Eaton; prior to this, on April 25, 2001, the village of Sawyerville had merged with Eaton.  After a 2004 referendum, however, Newport de-merged and was reconstituted as an independent municipality as of January 1, 2006.  Nevertheless, Newport and Cookshire-Eaton both remain part of the urban agglomeration of Cookshire-Eaton.

The community had a population of 5,171 in the Canada 2011 Census.

Demographics 

References

External links
 

Cities and towns in Quebec
Incorporated places in Estrie
Le Haut-Saint-François Regional County Municipality